Trigonisca is a genus of bees belonging to the family Apidae.

The species of this genus are found in Central and Southern America.

Species:

Trigonisca ameliae 
Trigonisca atomaria 
Trigonisca azteca 
Trigonisca bidentata 
Trigonisca browni 
Trigonisca buyssoni 
Trigonisca ceophloei 
Trigonisca chachapoya 
Trigonisca clavicornis 
Trigonisca discolor 
Trigonisca dobzhanskyi 
Trigonisca duckei 
Trigonisca euclydiana 
Trigonisca extrema 
Trigonisca flavicans 
Trigonisca fraissei 
Trigonisca graeffei 
Trigonisca hirsuticornis 
Trigonisca hirticornis 
Trigonisca intermedia 
Trigonisca longicornis 
Trigonisca longitarsis 
Trigonisca manauara 
Trigonisca martinezi 
Trigonisca maya 
Trigonisca mendersoni 
Trigonisca mepecheu 
Trigonisca meridionalis 
Trigonisca mixteca 
Trigonisca moratoi 
Trigonisca nataliae 
Trigonisca pediculana 
Trigonisca pipioli 
Trigonisca rondoni 
Trigonisca roubiki 
Trigonisca schulthessi 
Trigonisca tavaresi 
Trigonisca townsendi 
Trigonisca unidentata 
Trigonisca variegatifrons 
Trigonisca vitrifrons

References

Meliponini